Ripartitella brasiliensis is a species of fungus in the family Agaricaceae. It was originally described as new to science by Carlos Luigi Spegazzini in 1889. The fungus is found in the southwestern United States and Mexico, Central and South America, Africa, and the Bonin Islands of the western Pacific Ocean. It fruits in clusters on the decaying wood of hardwood trees, especially oak.

References

External links

Agaricaceae
Fungi of Africa
Fungi of Central America
Fungi of North America
Fungi of South America
Fungi described in 1889
Taxa named by Carlo Luigi Spegazzini